Defence Force Football Club is a football club based in Chaguaramas, Trinidad and Tobago that currently plays in the country's TT Pro League. The team plays its home games in Hasely Crawford Stadium in Mucurapo, Trinidad.

History

Founded in 1974, Defence Force F.C. is the nation's most successful football club, having won a total of 20 national championships. They won 15 titles in twenty-two seasons in the National League from 1974 to 1995, two titles in the Semi-Professional League between 1996 and 1998, and three championships since the Trinidad and Tobago league became professional in 1999 with the Pro League. They are also the only team from Trinidad and Tobago to have ever won the CONCACAF Champions' Cup, having won titles in 1978 and 1985.  In 1985, Defense Force achieved the treble, winning the National League, FA Trophy, and CONCACAF Champions' Cup. They are one of only two teams in the CONCACAF Federation to have achieved this feat, along with Cruz Azul.

Since the club is composed of the Trinidad and Tobago's protective forces, they are named Defence Force F.C. Usually included are officers, soldiers, and sailors from the Trinidad and Tobago Army and Coast Guard.

Club honours

League honours
 TT Pro League
 Champions (3): 1999, 2010–11, 2012–13
 Semi-Professional League
 Champions (2): 1996, 1997
 National League
 Champions (15): 1974, 1975, 1976, 1977, 1978, 1980, 1981, 1984, 1985, 1987, 1989, 1990, 1992, 1993, 1995
 Port of Spain Football League
 Champions (2): 1972, 1973

Cups and trophies

 FA Trophy
 Winners (6): 1974, 1981, 1985, 1989, 1991, 1996.
 Runners-up (4): 1995, 1998, 2005, 2012.
 First Citizens Cup
 Winners (3): 2002, 2009, 2016.
 Runners-up (5): 2000, 2004, 2010, 2012, 2013.
 Digicel Charity Shield
 Runners-up (3): 2012, 2013, 2016.
 TOYOTA Classic
 Runners-up (1): 2012
 Digicel Pro Bowl
 Winners (3): 2012, 2016, 2017.
 Runners-up (1): 2008.
 Lucozade Sport Goal Shield
 Runners-up (2): 2009, 2012

International honours
 CONCACAF Champions' Cup
 Winners (2): 1978, 1985
 Runner-up (2): 1987, 1988
 Copa Interamericana
 Runner-up (1): 1985
 CFU Club Championship
 Winners (1): 2001

Team management

Head Coach: Kerry Jamerson
Asst Coach: Ross Russell
Technical Director: Hutson Charles

Managerial history

 Hutson Charles (May 2003 – Sep 2004)
 Kerry Jamerson (Sep 2004 – April 2006)
 Anthony Barrington (April 2006– Nov 2006)
 Kerry Jamerson (Feb 2007– Dec 2008)
 Ross Russell (April 2009– Jan 2015)

Performance in CONCACAF competitions
1977 CONCACAF Champions' Cup
First Round v.  Violette AC – 0:2, 0:0 (Violette AC advances 4:0 on aggregate)

1978 CONCACAF Champions' Cup
First Round v.  Thomas United – 0:1, 2:3 (Defence Force FC advances 3:3(a) on aggregate)
Second Round v.  SV Transvaal – 1:1, 3:1 (Defence Force FC advances 4:2 on aggregate)
Third Round v.  SV Voorwaarts – 1:2, 2:0 (Defence Force FC wins 4:1 on aggregate)

1981 CONCACAF Champions' Cup
First Round v.  SV Transvaal – 0:1

1982 CONCACAF Champions' Cup
First Round v.  SV Robinhood – 1:1, 2:5 (SV Robinhood advances 6:3 on aggregate)

1983 CONCACAF Champions' Cup
First Round v.  SV Robinhood – 0:1, 1:2 (SV Robinhood advances 3:1 on aggregate)

1985 CONCACAF Champions' Cup
Second Round v.  JS Capesterre – 1:0, 0:1 (Defence Force FC advances 2:0 on aggregate)
Final Series v.  C.D. Olimpia – 2:0, 0:1 (Defence Force FC wins 2:1 on aggregate)

1987 CONCACAF Champions' Cup
Second Round v.  Club Franciscain – 4:2 (Defence Force FC advances 4:2 on aggregate)
Final Round v.  Trintoc – 2:1, 1:1 (Defence Force FC advances 3:2 on aggregate)
Final v.  Club América – 1:1, 0:2 (Club América wins 3:2 on aggregate)

1988 CONCACAF Champions' Cup
First Round v.  Club Franciscain – 2:2, 2:0 (Defence Force FC advances 4:2 on aggregate)
Second Round v.  Cardinals – 0:0, 1:0 (Defence Force FC advances 1:0 on aggregate)
Semi-Finals v.  SV Robinhood – 0:0, 2:0 (Defence Force FC advances 2:0 on aggregate)
Final v.  CD Olimpia – 2:0, 0:2 (CD Olimpia wins 4:0 on aggregate)

1989 CONCACAF Champions' Cup
First Round v.  CRKSV Jong Colombia – 2:0
First Round v.  FC Pinar del Río – 0:1
First Round v.  SV Juventus – 0:0
First Round v.  Trintoc – 1:0

1991 CONCACAF Champions' Cup
First Round v.  SV Robinhood – 0:1, 3:1 (Defence Force FC advances 3:2 on aggregate)
Second Round v.  Scholars International – 0:6, 1:0 (Defence Force FC advances 7:0 on aggregate)
Third Round v.  Police – 1:0, 1:3 (Police advances 3:2 on aggregate)

CFU Club Championship 2001
First Round v.  Rovers United – 9:1
Group Stage v.  Roulado – 5:1
Group Stage v.  SNL – 3:1

2002 CONCACAF Champions' Cup
First Round v.  Pachuca – 0:1, 4:0 (Pachuca advances 4:1 on aggregate)

References

External links
 Facebook page

 
Football clubs in Trinidad and Tobago
Association football clubs established in 1974
1974 establishments in Trinidad and Tobago
Military association football clubs
CONCACAF Champions League winning clubs